Blaise Godbe Lipman, known professionally as Blaise, is an American filmmaker, actor, political commentator, and a Time Person of the Year for his social activism.

Early life
Blaise was born and raised in rural Big Sur California to Kira Godbe, an American photographer, and Hillary Lipman, a British real estate investor and landscape designer. On his mother's side, he is the grandson of performance artist and political activist Ed Leeper, and Liz Leeper, a founding member of the ACLU. Blaise's paternal grandparents were Holocaust survivors, originally from Poland and Russia.

Career
A few months after moving to Hollywood, Blaise was cast as Brett Bailey on the fourth season of NBC's The Office. Blaise subsequently made a name for himself as a teen actor on TV shows Weeds, CSI: NY, Hawaii Five-0, as well Disney shows; Suite Life on Deck, and Pair of Kings. 
Blaise's film work includes acclaimed dramas Nobody Walks (Magnolia Pictures, Sundance 2012) and The Amateur (Tar & Feather, Dances with Films, 2015) for which he also served as co-producer, the lead role of Keegan Dark, in The Dark Place, an acclaimed thriller for which Blaise won a best actor award at South by SouthWest Film Festival, and the series regular role of Jared Fostmeyer on the lifetime Series Betrayed at 17.

He has written and directed short films that have played and won festivals internationally including Best Film at the UK Film Festival, Best Short at the London Film Festival, New Directors/New Films Festival, Carmel International Film Festival, Cinema Jam, Toronto International Film Festival, SXSW, NewFilmmakers NY, and Big Sur International.

In 2016, Lipman was named a Film Independent Fellow, and was invited to participate in the Director's Lab, supported by The Time Warner Foundation and the National Endowment for the Arts. Lipman is working with James Ponsoldt on his debut feature film In theShadows of the Rainbow.

He has also worked extensively with Ryan Murphy after being selected as part of his Half Foundation in 2017. He directed on Murphy's The Assassination of Gianni Versace: American Crime Story.

Lipman's visual curation and installation work has been featured at the MOMA, MOCA in Los Angeles, and the Institute of Contemporary Arts in London.

Personal life
Blaise initially was professionally known as a Blaise Embry, a surname his first agents recommended because they thought God in "Godbe" might be polarizing, and Lipman too ethnic. Blaise later returned to his given name upon becoming a filmmaker.
In October 2017 Lipman contributed to the launch of the "Me Too" movement when he came forward publicly about abuse suffered in the industry as a young actor, offering a platform to survivors of sexual assault. Blaise was the first to give a voice to male victims of sexual assault, who have traditionally been stigmatized.
Blaise was named one of Time magazine's People of the Year in 2017 for his work in the movement, alongside fellow celebrities Taylor Swift, Ashley Judd and Alyssa Milano, as well as lesser known activists Susan Fowler and Adama Iwu.

References

External links

 Heimbrod, Camille (October 21, 2017). Stranger Things' Star Finn Wolfhard Parts Ways With APA Agency, Tyler Grasham". International Business Times.

Living people
21st-century American male actors
Male actors from Los Angeles
American male film actors
American male television actors
1989 births
American people of British descent